Subaidha is a 1965 Indian Malayalam film,  directed by M. S. Mani and produced by H. H. Ebrahim. The film stars Madhu, Ambika, Prem Nawas and Bahadoor in the lead roles. The film had musical score by M. S. Baburaj.

Plot
It tells the story of Subaidha, a poor village girl from Northern Kerala. Her father died when she was an infant. Ahmed is her mother's nephew. He completes MBBS and returns from Madras. Ahmed goes to Subaida's house to meet his ailing aunt. Ahmed decides to marry Subaida and later marries her with the blessings of both their families. On the way back home, Ahmed meets an accident and becomes unconscious. Ahmed's friend Mammu sits by his bed looking after him during that night. Ahmed wakes up after midnight and meets his wife. After their first night, he dies. Only Mammu knows about the meeting of Ahmed with Subaida. Subaida gets pregnant and her suspicious in-laws expel her and send her back home. Her mother dies on hearing the news of her pregnancy and Subaida does not get a chance to tell her the truth. She later gives birth to a baby girl and leaves the child near the tomb of Ahmed. Mammu finds the baby and hands her over to a childless couple. Subaida joins that family as a nanny. Her daughter gets college education. She falls in love with her classmate and their marriage is fixed. The boy happens to be the son of Ahmed's elder brother. During the marriage, it is revealed that the girl is an orphan and the marriage gets cancelled. A few days later, Mammu reveals the secret of Subaida's pregnancy and the story ends happily with the marriage.

Cast

Madhu as Ahmed
Ambika as Subaida
Prem Nawas as Salim
Bahadoor as Mammu
Devaki
Haji Abdul Rahman
Meena as Ayisha
Nilambur Ayisha
Philomina as Raziya
Santo Krishnan
Suprabha
Saroja
Sachu (Tamil actress)
 Shukkoor
 S.A Fareed
 Ravi

Soundtrack
The music was composed by M. S. Baburaj and lyrics were written by P. Bhaskaran.

References

External links
 

1965 films
1960s Malayalam-language films